was a Japanese domain of the Edo period. It was associated with Chikugo Province in modern-day Fukuoka Prefecture on the island of Kyushu.

In the han system, Miike was a political and economic abstraction based on periodic cadastral surveys and projected agricultural yields.  In other words, the domain was defined in terms of kokudaka, not land area. This was different from the feudalism of the West.

List of daimyōs 
The hereditary daimyōs were head of the clan and head of the domain.

   Tachibana clan, 1621–1806; 1868–1871 (tozama; 10,000 koku)

Tanetsugu
Tanenaga
Taneakira
Tsuranaga
Nagahiro
Tanechika
Taneyoshi (transfer to Shimotedo Domain, succeeded by Tachibana Taneharu)
Taneyuki (returned from Shimotedo)

See also 
 List of Han
 Abolition of the han system

References

External links
 "Miike" at Edo 300 

Domains of Japan